Shawna DeeAnn Stoltenberg was Miss Minnesota 1993 and competed in the Miss America 1994 pageant broadcast live from Atlantic City, New Jersey in September 1993.

Miss America
Stoltenberg won an award for talent in the nationally televised event and earned enough scholarship money to graduate from college debt free.  She was also the first contestant in the history of the pageant to address the issue of missing children.

Personal life
Stoltenberg specializes in corporate talent management and development having worked for Prudential,  Ameriprise Financial, Allianz Life of North America, Target Corporation, and the Federal Reserve Bank of Minneapolis. She has more than 16 years of experience as a talent development consultant, executive coach, facilitator, and former television news anchor.

Stoltenberg is also a former speaker, trainer and board member for the Jacob Wetterling Foundation, a missing children's organization in Minnesota that works nationally to end the sexual exploitation and abduction of children. She has delivered presentations to more than 10,000 students, parents and community organizations on how to keep children safe.

She is a graduate of the University of Wisconsin–Madison with bachelor's degrees in Communications and Piano Performance. She earned her master's degree from the University of Minnesota–Twin Cities in Human Resource and Organizational Development.

References

http://education.umn.edu/alumni/link/2005Spring/Alum-Stoltenberg.html Shawna Stoltenberg: 
Student commencement speaker and Miss America contestant

External links
Miss Minnesota Alumni

Living people
Miss America 1994 delegates
People from Hennepin County, Minnesota
Year of birth missing (living people)